is a Japanese child actress and tarento. She received a certificate for Guinness World Record on behalf of a fashion show organized by T-ARTS Company Ltd, in which 1,274 participants modelled on a catwalk. She has a younger sister Karin, who was born in 2009.

Filmography

Television
  (TBS) (Ep. 3, 3 May 2009)
  (Fuji TV, 19 June 2009)
  (Fuji TV, 2010)
 {{nihongo|Film Factory'''s series Eigo Rhythm|FILM FACTORY 「えいごリズム」}} (TV Tokyo, 3 — 24 March 2010)
  (Fuji TV, 2011)
  (Fuji TV, 2011)
  (Fuji TV, 2011)
 Full Throttle Girl (or Zenkai Girl) (Fuji TV, 2011)
 Ikemen Desu ne (TBS, 2011) (Ep. 1)
 Renai Neet: Wasureta Koi no Hajimekata (TBS, 2012) (Ep. 1)
  (TBS, 2012)
  (TV Asahi, 2012)
  (Kansai TV) (Ep. 10, 10 December 2013)
  (WOWOW, 2015)
 Anohana: The Flower We Saw That Day (Fuji TV, 2015) — Menma (child)

FilmJōkyō Monogatari (2013) — Saki

 Anime films Your Name (2016) — Yotsuha MiyamizuLu over the Wall (2017) — LuWeathering with You (2019) — Yotsuha Miyamizu

DubbingThe Peanuts Movie'' (2015) — Lucy van Pelt

Discography

Singles 
Tani and Seiran Kobayashi released two music singles as part of the duo .
 "Toshishita no Otokonoko" (August 2012), cover of the 1975 song by the Candies
 "White Love" (December 2012), cover of the 1997 number-one song by Speed

References

External links 
 Kanon Tani profile at Theatre Academy
 Kanon Tani profile on the Oricon website
 

2004 births
Living people
Japanese child actresses
Japanese voice actresses
Japanese television personalities
Actors from Saitama Prefecture